Hatton Park was a cricket ground in Wellingborough, Northamptonshire.  The first recorded match on the ground was in 1873, when Wellingborough played a United North of England Eleven.  It was a United North of England Eleven that played a United South of England Eleven in the grounds only first-class match.  The final recorded match held on the ground came in 1884 when Northamptonshire played Essex.

References

External links
Hatton Park on CricketArchive
Hatton Park on Cricinfo

Defunct cricket grounds in England
Cricket grounds in Northamptonshire
Defunct sports venues in Northamptonshire
Sports venues completed in 1873